Lorenz Huber (24 February 1906 – 	6 October 1989) was a German international footballer.

References

1906 births
1989 deaths
Association football defenders
German footballers
Germany international footballers